Arthur James Roberts, Jr. (born November 4, 1942) is an American retired cardiac surgeon and former collegiate and professional football player. First attracting the attention of recruiters, in his youth he was quarterback for an undefeated Holyoke High School football team and described by Sports Illustrated as the most widely courted high school football player in New England at that time. He went on to play at Columbia University. He was drafted in the seventh round of the 1965 American Football League (AFL) draft by the New York Jets. In 1967, he was traded to the AFL Miami Dolphins, playing only one game with the team, in the final minutes of a 41–0 loss.

Roberts subsequently became a cardiac surgeon after graduating from Case Western Reserve University School of Medicine. He performed over 4,000 open-heart operations before retiring. He founded the New Jersey-based Living Heart Foundation in 2001.

See also
List of American Football League players

References

External links
 

1942 births
Living people
American cardiac surgeons
American football quarterbacks
American Football League players
Columbia Lions football players
Columbia University alumni
Miami Dolphins players
Parade High School All-Americans (boys' basketball)
Case Western Reserve University School of Medicine alumni
Sportspeople from Holyoke, Massachusetts
Physicians from Massachusetts